CARG may refer to:

 carg, a C function which computes argument of a complex number
 Compound annual rate of growth